Lambells Lagoon is an outer suburban area in Darwin. It is 47 km East of the Darwin CBD. Its Local Government Area is the Litchfield Municipality. The suburb is mostly a rural area, on the fringe of Metropolitan Darwin. In the most recent Australian census the population of Lambells Lagoon was 347.

Demographics
In the 2016 Census, there were 347 people in Lambells Lagoon. 46.6% of people were born in Australia and 46.9% of people spoke only English at home. The most common response for religion was No Religion at 36.3%.

References

External links
https://web.archive.org/web/20110629040718/http://www.nt.gov.au/lands/lis/placenames/origins/greaterdarwin.shtml#l#l

Suburbs of Darwin, Northern Territory